Jamke Chatta railway station is located in Jamke Chatta village,  Gujranwala district of Punjab province of the Pakistan.

See also
 List of railway stations in Pakistan
 Pakistan Railways

References

External links

Railway stations in Gujranwala District
Railway stations on Khanewal–Wazirabad Line